Damdiny Tsogtbaatar (born January 14, 1970) is a Mongolian politician and diplomat.

Biography and career 
He was born on January 4, 1970. In 1988 he graduated from the Soviet high school in Ulan Bator. In 1988 he entered Moscow State Institute of International Relations. In 1994-1998, he worked in the Asia and Africa Department of the Mongolian Foreign Ministry. In 1998, he received a degree from the Australian National University from the Faculty of Law and became an LLM in Legal Studies (International Law). In 1998-1999, he taught part-time at the Faculty of International Relations, Mongolian State University.

On 4 October 2017, The State Great Khural (Parliament) of Mongolia appointed him as the Foreign Minister of Mongolia.
Previously he has served as State Secretary of Ministry of Foreign Affairs, Minister for Nature, Environment and Tourism of Mongolia and Minister of Construction and Urban Development of Mongolia. Since 2016 he was member of the State Great Khural (Parliament) of Mongolia.
Tsogtbaatar is married and has two children.

Personal life 
Tsogtbaatar is married and has two children. He is fluent in English, Russian and Khmer.

References

1970 births
Living people
21st-century Mongolian politicians
Members of the State Great Khural
Environment ministers of Mongolia
Foreign ministers of Mongolia
Tourism ministers of Mongolia
Moscow State Institute of International Relations alumni
Australian National University alumni